Patricio Andrés Aguilera Cuadro (born 11 February 1987) is a Chilean former footballer who played as a midfielder.

Honours
Unión Temuco
 Tercera A:

External links
 
 

1987 births
Living people
Footballers from Santiago
Chilean footballers
Chilean Primera División players
Tercera División de Chile players
Primera B de Chile players
Club Deportivo Universidad Católica footballers
C.D. Antofagasta footballers
Unión Temuco footballers
Universidad de Concepción footballers
Santiago Morning footballers
San Marcos de Arica footballers
Naval de Talcahuano footballers
Association football midfielders